The 1960 Oregon Webfoots football team represented the University of Oregon as an independent during the 1960 NCAA University Division football season. In their 10th season under head coach Len Casanova, the Webfoots compiled a 7–3–1 record and outscored their opponents, 206 to 130. The team played home games at Hayward Field in Eugene, Oregon and Multnomah Stadium in Portland, Oregon.

The team's statistical leaders included Dave Grosz with 910 passing yards, Dave Grayson with 631 rushing yards, and Cleveland Jones with 402 receiving yards.

Schedule

References

Oregon
Oregon Ducks football seasons
Oregon Webfoots football